Ganges: River to Heaven, is a 2003 American documentary film by Boston filmmaker, Gayle Ferraro. The film documents the culture and beliefs of the Hindu religion across the Ganges River which has been considered holy in India.

Production

The five-person film crew spent almost four weeks living at Assi Ghat, Varanasi on the banks of the Ganges River and during that time fully documented the religious culture and rituals associated with both life and death in this photogenic region of the subcontinent of India. The film crew included some of the most experienced and talented professional technicians available in India.

Reception
Dennis Harvey of Variety reviewed "At once lyrical and smell-the-stench gritty, "Ganges: River to Heaven" provides a respectful, often engrossing overview of the water body that's among the world's holiest sites. Visually handsome package is enlightening on several levels, resulting in an attractive fest item with good prospects for public tubecast and possible limited theatrical exposure". Devin D. O'Leary of Alibi said "The film's only major drawback is that it never digs quite deep enough into its subject matter. The film is undeniably beautiful, shot with an eye for everyday detail—something which India is overflowing with. Still, as a simple, gorgeously shot primer on Hindu spirituality, Ganges: River of Heaven works, delivering the worthwhile message that maybe death can lead to a greater life.

References

External links
 

2003 documentary films
American documentary films
2003 films
Films set in Uttar Pradesh
Documentary films about Hinduism
Ganges
Culture of Varanasi
2000s American films